This is a list of serving utensils.

 Knives
 Splade
 Sporf
 Spife
 Knork
 Butter knife
 Cake and pie server
 Spoons
 spork
 Caviar spoon
 Ladle (spoon)
 Salt spoon
 Scoop (utensil)
 Slotted spoon
 Sugar spoon
 Fruit Spoon
 Miscellaneous
 Toffee hammer
 Tongs
Luncheon knife
Grapefruit knife

See also

 Holloware
 List of eating utensils
 List of food preparation utensils
 List of types of spoons

scraper

Utensil